Ernest Johnson may refer to:

 Ernest Johnson (cyclist) (1912–1997), British Olympic track cyclist
 Ernest W. Johnson (1924–2014), American physiatrist and electromyographer
 Ernest Lee Johnson (1960–2021), American convicted criminal executed in Missouri
 Ernest Leonard Johnson (1891–1977), South African astronomer
 Ernest Johnson (American football) (1921–1985), American football coach
 Ernest Norman Johnson (1915–2015), American politician in North Dakota

See also
 Moose Johnson (Thomas Ernest Johnson, 1886–1963), Canadian ice hockey defenceman
 Ernie Johnson (disambiguation)